The 73rd World Science Fiction Convention (Worldcon), also known as Sasquan, was held on 19–23 August 2015 at the Spokane Convention Center in Spokane, Washington, United States.

The convention was chaired by Sally Woehrle.

Participants

Guests of Honor 

 artist Brad Foster
 author David Gerrold
 author Vonda McIntyre
 filker Tom Smith
 fan Leslie Turek

NASA astronaut Kjell Lindgren participated from Earth orbit as Sasquan's Special Guest while aboard the International Space Station.

Programming and events

Masquerade 

The Sasquan masquerade was held in the First Interstate Center for the Arts (then known as the INB Performing Arts Center), on same campus as the Convention Center, in the evening of Friday, 16 August. There were 45 entrants competing for ten major awards. The Sasquan Masquerade Director was Sharon Sbarsky. Kevin Roche was the master of ceremonies and the judges were Brad W. Foster, David Gerrold, Sandy Pettinger, Kathy Sanders, and Syd Weinstein. The workmanship judges were Tanglwyst de Holloway and Michele Weinstein.

The winners, across four experience-based categories, were:

Young Fan division 

 Best Comic: "Ms. Marvel" by Sashti Ramadorai
 Best Media: "Arya Stark" by Alexis Davis
 Best in Class: "Emma Swan" by Melinda Kilbourne

Novice division 

Workmanship awards:
 Honorable Mention: "Red" by Megan
 Best Use of Traditional Materials: "San" (Princess Mononoke) by Casandra Friend
 Best Woodworking Magic: "Ashe and Lux" (League of Legends) by Rachelle Henning and Tori Wheeler
 Best Accessory: "Fauntal" by Ashlee
 Best Use of Recycled Materials: "Immortan Joanna" by Claire Stromberg
 Judge's Choice (de Holloway): "Octopus Dress" by Desiree Gould
 Judge's Choice (Weinstein): "Don't Blink" by Paulina Crownhart and Julia Buragino
 Rising Star Award: "We Are Groot" by Jason Giddings
 Best in Class: "We Are Groot" by Jason Giddings

Presentation awards:
 Honorable Mention: "Don't Blink" by Paulina Crownhart and Julia Buragino
 Dead Ringer Award: "The Captain" (Captain Kangaroo) by Robert Mitchell
 Best Re-Creation: "Immortan Joanna" by Claire Stromberg
 Best in Class: "We Are Groot" by Jason Giddings

Journeyman division 

Workmanship awards:
 Honorable Mention: "Luigi" by Bevan Rogers
 Honorable Mention (Transformation): "Diana Prince/Wonder Woman" by Denise Tanaka
 Best Use of Non-Traditional Materials: "Sleeping Beauty, the Vintage Edition" by Hal Bass, Sharon Bass, Barbara Galler-Smith, Janine Wardale, John Wardale, and Ita Vandenbroek
 Best Use of Materials That Hate You: "Theia the Tabbybrook Mage" by Natalie Rogers
 Best Patterning and Fitting: "Marian Keiffer" by Debi "7 of Eowyn" Schwartz
 Worst Infection of the Beading Disease: Tie:-
 "Doctor Who Time Lords" by Carol Hamill and Forrest Nelson
 "Victorian Justice League" by Barbara Hoffert, Mark Ezell, Ellie Ezell, Ann Ezell, Zachary Brant, and Kathryn Brant
 Rising Star Award: "Blood Dragon Lord" by Lesli Jones
 Best in Class: "Blood Dragon Lord" by Lesli Jones

Presentation awards:
 Most Beautiful: "Marian Keiffer" by Debi "7 of Eowyn" Schwartz
 Best Re-Creation: "Doctor Who Time Lords" by Carol Hamill and Forrest Nelson
 Best in Class: "Blood Dragon Lord" by Lesli Jones

Master division 

Workmanship awards:
 Best Use of a Sweater Pattern: "Knit Klingon Warrior" by Shael Hawman
 Best Use of Light Refraction: "Dreams of a Rainbow" by Susan Torgerson and Chris Corbitt
 Best Use of Shower Accessories: "Rainbow Jellyfish" by Orchid Cavett
 Best Dyeing: "Senator Padmé Amidala" by Torrey Stenmark
 Most Skill-Sets in a Single Bound: "Professor R. Miles Levell, Gentleman Time Traveler" by Richard Miles
 Go Big or Go Home Award: "Princess Marshmallow" by Lance Ikegawa
 Rising Star Award: Tie:-
 "Knit Klingon Warrior" by Shael Hawman
 "Rainbow Jellyfish" by Orchid Cavett

Presentation awards:
 Honorable Mention: "Rainbow Jellyfish" by Orchid Cavett
 Honorable Mention: "Senator Padmé Amidala" by Torrey Stenmark
 Best Critter: "Roll for Initiative" by Jonnalyn Wolfcat, Melissa Quinn, Alita Quinn, and Anita Taylor
 Most Beautiful: "Princess Marshmallow" by Lance Ikegawa
 Best in Class: "Professor R. Miles Levell, Gentleman Time Traveler" by Richard Miles

Overall 

 Best in Show (workmanship): "Roll for Initiative" by Jonnalyn Wolfcat et al.
 Best in Show (presentation): "Victorian Justice League" by Barbara Hoffert, Ann Ezell, Mark Ezell, Kathryn Brant, Zach Brant, Ellie Ezell

Awards 

Of the 2,122 valid nominating ballots, 2,119 were submitted online and 3 on paper. The year's final ballot was dominated by slates organized as the "Sad Puppies" and "Rabid Puppies". The controversy brought international press attention to the awards process and caused several nominees to withdraw from consideration. However, only one slate candidate won an award, and in the five categories in which only slate candidates were nominated, no award was given.

2015 Hugo Awards 

 Best Novel: The Three-Body Problem, by Cixin Liu, translated by Ken Liu (Tor Books)
 Best Novella: no award
 Best Novelette: "The Day the World Turned Upside Down", by Thomas Olde Heuvelt (Lightspeed Magazine, April 2014)
 Best Short Story: no award
 Best Related Work: no award
 Best Graphic Story: Ms. Marvel, "Volume 1: No Normal", written by G. Willow Wilson, illustrated by Adrian Alphona and Jake Wyatt (Marvel Comics)
 Best Dramatic Presentation, Long Form: Guardians of the Galaxy, written by James Gunn and Nicole Perlman; directed by James Gunn
 Best Dramatic Presentation, Short Form: Orphan Black, "By Means Which Have Never Yet Been Tried", written by Graham Manson, directed by John Fawcett (Temple Street Productions, Space/BBC America)
 Best Professional Editor, Long Form: no award
 Best Professional Editor, Short Form: no award
 Best Professional Artist: Julie Dillon
 Best Semiprozine: Lightspeed Magazine, edited by John Joseph Adams, Wendy N. Wagner, Stefan Rudnicki, Rich Horton, and Christie Yant
 Best Fanzine: Journey Planet, edited by James Bacon, Chris Garcia, Alissa McKersie, Colin Harris, and Helen Montgomery
 Best Fancast: Galactic Suburbia Podcast, by Alisa Krasnostein, Alexandra Pierce, Tansy Rayner Roberts (presenters) and Andrew Finch (producer)
 Best Fan Writer: Laura J. Mixon
 Best Fan Artist: Elizabeth Leggett

Art Show Awards 

 Best Convention Theme: "Whatever Happened to Bigfoot" by Sandra Ackley
 Best 3D Non-Jewelry: "Just Keeping an Eye on Things" by Mark Chapman
 Best 3D Jewelry: "Lapis Dragon" by Arlin Robins
 Best 2D Color: "The Dala Horse" by Julie Dillon
 Best 2D Monochrome: "Othello" by M. Scott Hammond
 Judges Choice: "Resurrection of Perspective" by Andy VanOverberghe
 Body of Work: Andy VanOverberghe
 Staff Choice: "Tracking a Giant" by Jeff Sturgeon
 Fan Choice: "Tang Horse" by Elizabeth Berrien
 GOH Choice: "Circles of Quanta 2" by Andy VanOverberghe

Other awards 

 John W. Campbell Award for Best New Writer: Wesley Chu
 Special Committee Award: Jay Lake
 First Fandom Hall of Fame award: Julian May, Margaret Brundage (posthumous), Bruce Pelz (posthumous), F. Orlin Tremaine (posthumous)
 Sam Moskowitz Archive Award: David Aronovitz
 Forrest J. Ackerman Big Heart Award: Ben Yalow

Staff 

After the "Spokane in 2015" bid chaired by Alex von Thorn won the site selection vote, Sally Woehrle and Bobbie DuFault were announced as co-chairs of the convention on behalf of the Seattle Westercon Organizing Committee. DuFault died suddenly on the morning of 14 September 2013. The convention announced that Sally Woehrle would serve as chair with Glenn Glazer, Pierre Pettinger, and Mike Willmoth as vice-chairs.

Site selection 

The location was selected on 31 August 2013, by the members of the 71st World Science Fiction Convention in San Antonio, Texas.

Three committees announced bids and qualified to be on the site selection ballot for the 73rd World Science Fiction Convention:
 Helsinki in 2015, bid chair Eemeli Aro, would be held 6–10 August 2015
 Orlando in 2015, bid chair Adam Beaton, would be held 2–6 September 2015
 Spokane in 2015, bid chair Alex von Thorn, would be held 19–23 August 2015

The first contested Worldcon selection since the 2007 vote for the 2009 Worldcon site saw active campaigning and drew celebrity endorsements. Authors George R. R. Martin and Cory Doctorow publicly supported the Helsinki bid and encouraged their fans to vote while artist Phil Foglio declared his support for Spokane's bid and artist Bob Eggleton declared his support for Orlando.

Spokane won the site selection contest on the third round of ballot counting in Australian-style preferential balloting. Spokane finished with 645 votes, gaining a majority over Helsinki with 610. Orlando was dropped in the second round with 307 votes and "none of the above" had been eliminated in the first round. Boston, Minneapolis, and Locust Grove, Virginia, each received multiple write-in votes with Pyongyang and other hoax sites receiving single write-in votes.

Future site selection 

Four committees announced bids to host the 75th World Science Fiction Convention and filed all of the required paperwork by the February 2015 deadline: "Nippon in 2017", "Montréal in 2017", "Helsinki in 2017", and "Washington D.C. in 2017". The 2017 site selected by the voters was announced during the convention's third World Science Fiction Society business meeting, on Saturday, 22 August 2015. With 1363 votes out of 2625 valid ballots, Helsinki won on the first ballot and will operate as "Worldcon 75". DC17 ran second with 878 votes, Montréal third with 228, and Nippon fourth with 120.

See also 

 Hugo Award
 Science fiction
 Speculative fiction
 World Science Fiction Society
 Worldcon

References

External links 

 Sasquan official website 
 "Come to Sasquan" by Visit Spokane

2015 conferences
2015 in Washington (state)
Culture of Spokane, Washington
Science fiction conventions in the United States
Worldcon